Siphonium gaederopi is a species of sea snail, a marine gastropod mollusk in the family Vermetidae, the worm snails or worm shells.

Description

Distribution

References

Vermetidae
Gastropods described in 1850